The Tri-County Conference (not to be confused with conferences of the same name located in the northern and southern portions of the state) was a high school sports league that existed until the late 1960s. Originally the Sullivan County Conference, the SCC added L&M and Midland from the folding Greene County Conference, then assumed the TCC name when Cory from Clay County was added two years later. The league was hit hard by consolidation that next year, and had three members for two more years until Cory was closed.

 Dugger changed its name to Union in 1965.

References

Indiana high school athletic conferences
High school sports conferences and leagues in the United States